The Ilhéus do Rombo, also known as the Ilhéus Secos (Portuguese for "Dry Islets", because of their aridity and paucity of vegetation), are a group of small, uninhabited islands in the Cape Verde archipelago, lying  off the coast of north-west Africa in the Atlantic Ocean. The islets form an integral nature reserve. The two major islets of the chain are Ilhéu Grande and Ilhéu de Cima. Administratively they are part of the municipality of Brava. They can be seen from Brava and, sometimes, from Fogo.

Description
The larger islets have some sparse grassland. Ilhéu Grande is on the west side of the group. Some smaller unvegetated islets and rocks, including the Ilhéu do Rei, Ilhéu Sapado and Ilhéu Luiz Carneiro, lie between them.

Fauna
Ilhéu de Cima is famous for its seabird colonies. Ilhéu Grande, which has been used by goat farmers and whalers in the past, does not currently support breeding seabirds, though large colonies must have existed formerly as the island has thick layers of guano. The island group has been identified as an Important Bird Area (IBA) by BirdLife International because it supports seabird colonies as well as peregrine falcons and Iago sparrows. Birds include the Frigate bird (Pelagodroma marina) numbering around 1,000 in 1989, the Boyd's shearwater (Puffinus boydi), Oceanodroma castro, Bulwer's petrel (Bulweria bulwerii), the brown booby (Sula leucogaster) (50 pairs between 1986 and 1990) and Phaethon aethereus (only 5-10 couples between 1986 and 1990). Also there is a subspecies of the Peregrine falcon named madens, discovered in the mid-1960s with only 15 to 20 pairs.

Sea turtles have been reported to nest occasionally on the small, sandy beaches of Ilhéu de Cima.  Other marine fauna also dominates underwater surrounding the islets.  Other fauna includes the gecko species Tarentola protogigas.

See also
List of islands of Cape Verde

References

Brava Municipality
Secos Ilheu
Secos Ilheu